Lars Teutenberg (born 2 September 1970 in Mettmann) is a former German professional bicycle rider. He is the older brother of Sven and Ina-Yoko Teutenberg, who are also professional bicycle riders. After retiring from the professional peloton, Teutenberg continued to compete in individual time trials. He was also involved in supervising Matthias Brändle's attempt on the hour record in October 2014.

In October 2016  announced that he had been appointed as the team's performance director.

Major results

1992
 1st Tour de Wallonie
1996
 IHPVA recumbent hour record: 
1998
 1st Overall Thüringen Rundfahrt der U23
1999
 IHPVA recumbent hour record: 
2001
 9th Overall Tour of Japan
1st Stage 4
 10th Nationale Sluitingsprijs
2002
 IHPVA recumbent hour record: 
2003
 1st Cinturó de l'Empordà
 1st Rund um Düren
2007
 2nd National Time Trial Championships
2012
 3rd National Time Trial Championships
2014
 3rd National Time Trial Championships
2015
 8th White Spot / Delta Road Race

References

1970 births
Living people
German male cyclists
People from Mettmann
Sportspeople from Düsseldorf (region)
Cyclists from North Rhine-Westphalia